Free Money may refer to:

 Free Money (film), a 1998 Canadian film
 "Free Money" (song), a 1975 song by Patti Smith
 Freigeld (German for Free Money), a monetary unit proposed by German economist Silvio Gesell